Dixin is a protein that in humans is encoded by the DIXDC1 gene.  When active it stops cancer metastasis due to extreme stickiness, both in vitro and in vivo.

References

Further reading 

 
 
 
 
 
 
 

Genes associated with cancer